The Young Romans are a pop/indie duo from Los Angeles, California. The duo consists of singer/piano-player Brad Hooks, and Chilean-born singer/guitar player Sari Mellafe.

History
In 2010, The Young Romans were signed to Jim Roach (Producer)'s label "Red Parade Music" and released their first EP "Yesterday Night".  During the following two years, the duo worked in the studio with Jim, developing their sound until they were ready to release their first full-length album, Tiger Child. 

Their second single "Where You Go" was featured as the end credits song in the Ewan McGregor / Emily Blunt film, Salmon Fishing in the Yemen, once again putting the band on the world stage. 

Their song "Circles" was also featured in an episode of the third season of "The Fosters" Idyllwild (TV Episode 2015).

Discography
 2010: Yesterday Night - EP
 2012: New Beginnings - Single and Tiger Child - LP
 2015: Bells and Sirens, Pt. I - EP

External links

American musical duos
Indie pop groups from Los Angeles
Musical groups established in 2010
2010 establishments in California